Charaxes cacuthis is a butterfly in the family Nymphalidae. It is found on Madagascar. The habitat consists of lowland and coastal forests.

Description

A full description is given by Walter Rothschild and Karl Jordan (1900). Novitates Zoologicae volume 7:287-524.  page 457-458 as subspecies of Charaxes etesipe (for terms see Novitates Zoologicae volume 5:545-601 )
Seitz- Very similar to Charaxes etesipe In the male, however, the blue transverse band 
is continuous and about 8 mm. in breadth, not narrowed anteriorly; the blue spots in cellules la and lb on the forewingare about 6 mm. in breadth and joined together into a band. The female is distinguished by having the broad median band of the upper surface white on the hindwing and to 
vein 2 or 3 of the forewing, thence orange-yellow to the costal margin of the forewing. Madagascar.
The tails of both sexes are longer than those of any other members of the etesipe group.

Life history

The larvae feed on Annona senegalensis.

Realm
Afrotropical realm

Classification
Closely related to Charaxes penricei and Charaxes etesipe 

Charaxes cacuthis  is a member of the species group Charaxes etesipe.

The clade members are:
Charaxes etesipe nominate
Charaxes penricei 
Charaxes achaemenes 
Charaxes paradoxa
Charaxes cacuthis
Charaxes bwete
Charaxes cristalensis

References

Victor Gurney Logan Van Someren (1966). Revisional notes on African Charaxes (Lepidoptera: Nymphalidae). Part III. Bulletin of the British Museum (Natural History) (Entomology)45-101.

External links
Charaxes cacuthis images at Consortium for the Barcode of Life 
African Butterfly Database Range map via search

Butterflies described in 1863
cacuthis
Endemic fauna of Madagascar
Butterflies of Africa
Taxa named by William Chapman Hewitson